Below is a list of newspapers published in Portugal.

List
The number of national daily newspapers in Portugal was 32 in 1950, whereas it was 27 in 1965.

Political newspapers
 Avante!, published by the Portuguese Communist Party
 Esquerda Socialista
 Liberdade
 Portugal Socialista, published by the Socialist Party
 Povo Livre, published by the Social Democratic Party

Defunct newspapers

, Lisbon (tabloid)
A Capital, Lisbon (1968–2005)
 Combate, (1974-1978)
Comércio do Porto, Porto (1854–2005)
Diário Digital, Lisbon (1999–2017)
Diário Económico (1989-2016)
Diário Popular, Lisbon (1943–1991)
 Global Notícias (daily, free) (2007-2010)
Metro, (2004-2016)
Notícias de Évora, Évora (1900-1992)
Notícias de Tarde, (1981-1984)
O Independente, Lisbon (1988–2006)
O Século, Lisbon (1880–1978)
Semanário Económico, Lisbon (folded 2009)

See also
 
 Media of Portugal
 List of magazines in Portugal
 List of radio stations in Portugal
 Television in Portugal

References

Notes

Bibliography
in English
 
 
 
 
 
 

in Portuguese

External links 
 
 Jornais de Portugal
 Banca de Jornais Sapo
 The Portuguese-American Journal (PAJ) is an online  interactive publication dedicated to the Portuguese-American heritage with the purpose of informing and offering an insight into the Portuguese-American experience. New material is added to the PAJ daily. - Portuguese American Journal
 Research archive for Web pages history in Portugal
 Exhibition of Portuguese newspapers Websites preserved on Arquivo.pt

''List
Portugal
Newspapers